An African-initiated church (AIC) is a Christian church independently started in Africa by Africans rather than chiefly by missionaries from another continent.

Nomenclature
A variety of overlapping terms exist for these forms of Christianity: African-initiated churches, African independent churches, African indigenous churches, and African-instituted churches. The abbreviation AIC covers them all. The differences in names correspond to the aspect that a researcher wishes to emphasise. For instance, those who wish to point out that AICs exhibit African cultural forms, describe them as indigenous. These terms have largely been imposed upon such groups and may not be the way they would describe themselves.

The term African refers to the fact that these Christian groupings formed in Africa, but AICs differ from one another. Not all African cultural systems are the same.  Regional variations occur among West, East, and Southern Africans, and the AICs will reflect these. AICs can now be found outside Africa.

Location
African-initiated churches are found across Africa; they are particularly well-documented in southern Africa and West Africa. Pauw suggests that at least 36 per cent of the population of Africa belong to an African-initiated church.

Origins
During the colonial era starting in the 1800s, when European powers took control of most of the African continent, black converts to Christianity were unable fully to reconcile their beliefs with the teachings of their church leaders, and split from their parent churches. The reasons for these splits were usually either:
Political – an effort to escape white control
Historical – many of the parent churches, particularly those from a Protestant tradition, had themselves emerged from a process of schism and synthesis
Cultural – the result of trying to accommodate Christian belief within an African world view

Some scholars argue that independent churches or religious movements demonstrate syncretism or partial integration between aspects of Christian belief and African traditional religion. Often these churches have resulted from a process of acculturation between traditional African beliefs and Protestant Christianity, and have split from their parent churches.  Bengt Sundkler, one of the most prominent pioneers of research on African independent churches in South Africa, initially argued that AICs were bridges back to a pre-industrial culture. Later, he recognized instead that AICs helped their affiliates to adapt to a modernizing world that was hostile to their cultural beliefs.

Classification and taxonomy
There are thousands of African-initiated churches (more than 10,000 in South Africa alone) and each one has its own characteristics. Ecclesiologists, missiologists, sociologists and others have tried to group them according to common characteristics, though disagreements have arisen about which characteristics are most significant, and which taxonomy is most accurate.  Though it is possible to distinguish groups of denominations with common features, there is also much overlap, with some denominations sharing the characteristics of two or more groups.

Many AICs share traditions with Christians from other parts of the Christian world, and these can also be used in classifying them. So there are AICs which share some beliefs or practices with Anglican, Methodist, Pentecostal, and Orthodox traditions. Some are Sabbatarian, some are Zionist, and so on.

Ethiopian churches
Ethiopian churches generally retain the Christian doctrines of their mother church in an unreformed state. Ethiopian African-initiated churches, which are recently formed Protestant congregations, mostly in southern Africa, arose from the Ethiopian movement of the late nineteenth century, which taught that African Christian churches should be under the control of black people. They should not be confused with the Ethiopian Orthodox Tewahedo Church or Coptic Orthodox Church, which have a much longer and an utterly distinct doctrinal history.  Some denominations that arose from the Ethiopian movement have united with these earlier denominations.

Zionist churches
Zionist Churches such as the Zion Christian Church, trace their origins to the Christian Catholic Apostolic Church in Zion, founded by John Alexander Dowie, with its headquarters at Zion, Illinois, in the United States. (It is now called Christ Community Church). Zionist Churches are found chiefly in Southern Africa. In the early 1900s, Zionist missionaries went to South Africa from the United States and established congregations. They emphasised divine healing, abstention from pork, and the wearing of white robes.

The Zionist missionaries were followed by Pentecostal ones, whose teaching was concentrated on spiritual gifts and baptism with the Holy Spirit, with glossolalia as the initial evidence of this. The predominantly white Apostolic Faith Mission of South Africa arose out of this missionary effort and emphasises the Pentecostal teaching.

The black Zionists retained much of the original Zionist tradition. The Zionists split into several different denominations, although the reason for this was more the rapid growth of the movement than divisions. A split in the Zionist movement in the US meant that after 1908 few missionaries came to southern Africa.  The movement in southern Africa and its growth has been the result of black leadership and initiative. As time passed some Zionist groups began to mix aspects of traditional African beliefs, such as veneration of the dead, with Christian doctrine. Many Zionists stress faith healing and revelation, and in many congregations the leader is viewed as a prophet.

Messianic churches
Some AICs with strong leadership have been described by some researchers as Messianic, but opinions also changed. The churches that have been called "Messianic" focus on the power and sanctity of their leaders; often the leaders are thought by their followers to possess Jesus-like characteristics. Denominations described as Messianic include Kimbanguism in the Democratic Republic of the Congo; the Nazareth Baptist Church of Isaiah Shembe in KwaZulu-Natal, South Africa; and the Zion Christian Church of Engenas Lekganyane with headquarters in Limpopo, South Africa, and the Ibandla Lenkosi Apostolic Church in Zion of South Africa and Swaziland.

Aladura Pentecostal churches
The Aladura Pentecostal churches originated in Nigeria. They rely on the power of prayer and in all effects of the baptism of the Holy Spirit. Today such churches include Christ Apostolic Church, Cherubim and Seraphim movement, Celestial Church of Christ and Church of the Lord (Aladura). The first Aladura Movement was started  in 1918 at Ijebu Ode, now in Ogun State, Nigeria, by Sophia Odunlami and Joseph Sadare, respectively a school teacher and a goldsmith. They both attended St. Saviour's Anglican Church. They rejected infant baptism and all forms of medicine, whether western or traditional. In consequence, they initiated the "Prayer Band", popularly called Egbe Aladura. Joseph Sadare was compelled to give up his post in the Synod and others were forced to resign their jobs and to withdraw their children from the Anglican School. The Aladura began as a renewal movement in search of true spirituality.

A revival took place during the 1918 flu pandemic. This consolidated the formation of the prayer group and the group was named Precious Stone and later the Diamond Society. By 1920, the Diamond Society had grown tremendously and had started to form branches around the Western region of Nigeria. In particular, David Odubanjo went to start the Lagos branch. The group emphasised divine healing, Holiness, and All Sufficiency of God, which form the three cardinal beliefs of the Church today. For this reason, the group had association with Faith Tabernacle of Philadelphia and changed its name to Faith Tabernacle of Nigeria.

The Great Revival in Nigeria started in 1930 where the Leaders of the Cherubim & Seraphim, The Church of the Lord (Aladura) and the Faith Tabernacle played important roles. Adherents believe that these leaders – Joseph Sadare of "Egbe Aladura", David Odubanjo of "Diamond Society", Moses Orimolade of "Cherubim & Seraphim", and Josiah Ositelu of "The Church of the Lord (Aladura)" performed several miracles. The revival started in Ibadan in the South-West of Nigeria and later spread to other parts of the country.

The Revival group went through several name changes until, after 24 years of its formation, it finally adopted the name Christ Apostolic Church (CAC) in 1942. Today, CAC has spread worldwide and is the precursor of Aladura Pentecostal Churches in Nigeria. The Church has established several educational establishments at all levels of Nigerian society, including Joseph Ayo Babalola University and a series of primary and secondary schools.

See also

Apostles of Johane Maranke
Celestial Church of Christ
Deeper Life Bible Church
Church of the Lord (Aladura)
Christ Apostolic Church
Legio Maria of African Church Mission
Kimbanguist Church
Zion Christian Church
List of Christian denominations

Notes

References

Footnotes

Bibliography

Further reading

External links
 African Christians, focus on African Initiated Orthodoxies
 African initiated churches (Archived 2009-10-24)
 Brotherhood of the Cross and Star

African initiated churches
Indigenous Christianity